The following is the final results of the Iran Super League 2007/08 basketball season.

Regular season

Standings

Results

Playoffs

Championship

1st round

Quarterfinals

Semifinals
Mahram vs. Kaveh

Saba Battery vs. Zob Ahan

3rd place match

Final

Classification 5th–8th

Classification 9th–12th
All matches in Azadi Basketball Hall, Tehran.

Final standings

References
 I.R. Iran Basketball Federation

External links
Super League page on Asia-Basket

Iranian Basketball Super League seasons
League
Iran